Paolo Valeri (born 16 May 1978) is an Italian football referee, appointed by FIFA as an international referee on 1 January 2011.

References

Living people
Italian football referees
Sportspeople from Rome
1978 births
2018 FIFA World Cup referees